Rykoff may refer to:

Rykoff, character in The Silent Battle
Alan, Jorja and Marcie Rykoff, characters in Strangers (Dean Koontz novel)